Linda bei Neustadt an der Orla is a village and a former municipality in the district Saale-Orla-Kreis, in Thuringia, Germany. Since December 2019, it is part of the town Neustadt an der Orla.

References

Former municipalities in Thuringia
Saale-Orla-Kreis